Magia is an genus of Australian planthoppers in the tribe Acarnini, erected by William Lucas Distant in 1907.

Species
Fulgoromorpha Lists on the Web includes:
 Magia stuarti Soulier-Perkins, 2008
 Magia subocellata Distant, 1907 - type species

References

External Links

Auchenorrhyncha genera
Lophopidae
Hemiptera of Australia